Goler Metropolitan AME Zion Church, originally known as East Fourth Street Baptist Church, is a historic African Methodist Episcopal Zion church located at 1435 E. Fourth Street in Winston-Salem, Forsyth County, North Carolina.  It was built in 1924, and is a front-gabled brick church with two prominent domed towers and flanking one-story hipped-roof wings in the Classical Revival style.  The front facade features a prominent pedimented porch supported by stuccoed Doric order columns and Ionic order pilasters.  The interior is based on the Akron Plan.  The building was acquired by an African-American congregation split from the Goler Memorial African Methodist Episcopal Zion Church in 1942.  The congregation changed their name to Goler Metropolitan A.M.E. Zion Church in 1953.

It was listed on the National Register of Historic Places in 1999.

References

African-American history in Winston-Salem, North Carolina
Baptist churches in North Carolina
African Methodist Episcopal Zion churches in North Carolina
Churches in Winston-Salem, North Carolina
Churches on the National Register of Historic Places in North Carolina
Neoclassical architecture in North Carolina
Churches completed in 1924
20th-century Methodist church buildings in the United States
National Register of Historic Places in Winston-Salem, North Carolina
Neoclassical church buildings in the United States